Nicolás Fuchs Sierlecki (born 10 August 1982 in Lima) is a Peruvian rally driver. He is racing in the WRC since the 2009 season.

Career results

WRC results

PWRC results

WRC-2 results

External links 
 eWRC-results.com profile

1982 births
Sportspeople from Lima
Peruvian racing drivers
Living people
World Rally Championship drivers
Dakar Rally drivers